Hololepta elongata, is a species of clown beetle found in many Oriental countries including, India, Sri Lanka, Indonesia, New Guinea and Philippines.

The average body size is about 8.0 mm.

References 

Histeridae
Insects of Sri Lanka
Insects described in 1834